Natasha Bassett (born ca. 1992) is an Australian actress.

Early life 
Bassett was born in Sydney, Australia. She began acting in high school and moved to New York at age nineteen to pursue a career in acting.

Career
Natasha Bassett started acting at the age of 13. She landed the lead role in the Australian Theatre for Young People's production of Romeo and Juliet and studied at the National Institute of Dramatic Art. 

Bassett landed the lead in the MTV film, Dungoona (2009), and appeared on several Australian television series (Rake (2010), Wild Boys (2011), Cops L.A.C. (2010)), while attending classes. After graduating high school, she appeared in the film, Mental.

At 19, she was awarded a screenwriting scholarship from the ArtStart Screenwriters Program, where she wrote and directed her short film, Kite (2013). The short was featured in the Rhode Island International Film Festival, Balinale International Film Festival, and the Big Bear Lake International Film Festival.

Bassett moved to New York City, studied at the Atlantic Acting School, and relocated to Los Angeles for the NBC series, Camp (2013). She appeared in the indie drama, Katie Says Goodbye (2016), and as 50s-era starlet Gloria DeLamour in Hail, Caesar! (2016).

Bassett played Britney Spears in the Lifetime biopic Britney Ever After in 2017.

Filmography

Film

Television

References

External links

Living people
21st-century Australian actresses
Australian film actresses
Actresses from Sydney
Australian women screenwriters
Australian women film directors
Australian film directors
Year of birth missing (living people)
1990s births